Dementia: The International Journal of Social Research and Practice is a bimonthly peer-reviewed academic journal that covers research in the field of dementia studies. Its editors-in-chief are Ruth Bartlett VID Specialized University, Norway& University of Southampton and  Elaine Wiersma(Lakehead University). It was established in 2002 and is currently published by SAGE Publications.

Abstracting and indexing 
The journal is abstracted and indexed in:
Academic Search Premier
Applied Social Sciences Index & Abstracts
Current Contents/Social & Behavioral Sciences
Social Sciences Citation Index
Scopus

External links 
 

SAGE Publishing academic journals
English-language journals
Gerontology journals
Bimonthly journals
Publications established in 2002